Our Lady of Guadalupe Seminary is the second seminary of the Priestly Fraternity of St. Peter, a Society of Apostolic Life in the Catholic Church.

The seminary was canonically established in 1988 by Pope John Paul II in accordance with his letter Ecclesia Dei adflicta and opened in 2000. Located in Denton, Nebraska, near Lincoln, it was founded primarily to serve English-speaking seminarians for the Fraternity from North America and to provide traditionalist Catholic education. Nonetheless, the custumal of the seminary includes a provision for students who are not members of the Fraternity but are studying for the priesthood in other ecclesiastical organizations, and since 2008 the seminary has served as the location of philosophical and theological education for clerical members of the Sons of the Most Holy Redeemer. The seminary has also housed members of the Knights of the Holy Eucharist, brothers of the Franciscan tradition who originate from the Shrine of the Most Blessed Sacrament

The seminarians receive training in the ancient Tridentine liturgy as it existed in 1962, prior to and during the Second Vatican Council; Gregorian chant is also an integral part of the education. The seminary offers at least one formal vocational retreat annually for those interested in considering priesthood. Admission is limited to males, in accordance with the Catholic understanding of the priesthood.

The first phase of the seminary complex was designed by Thomas Gordon Smith Architects in a Romanesque style and completed in 2000. Seminarians live in the dormitory wing.

The current rector is Fr. Josef Bisig, F.S.S.P.

External links
 Our Lady of Guadalupe
 Priestly Fraternity of Saint Peter
 Video about Life at Our Lady of Guadalupe Seminary

Priestly Fraternity of St. Peter
Catholic seminaries in the United States
Seminaries and theological colleges in Nebraska
Catholic universities and colleges in Nebraska
Educational institutions established in 1988
Educational institutions established in 2000
Education in Lancaster County, Nebraska
Buildings and structures in Lancaster County, Nebraska
1988 establishments in Nebraska
2000 establishments in Nebraska